John Whitmer (August 27, 1802 – July 11, 1878) was an early leader in the Latter Day Saint movement. He was one of the Eight Witnesses of the Book of Mormon's golden plates. Whitmer was also the first official Church Historian and a member of the presidency of the church in Missouri from 1834 to 1838.

Biography
Whitmer was born in Pennsylvania on August 27, 1802  to Peter Whitmer, Sr. and Mary Musselman. He had seven siblings. In 1809, the Whitmer family moved to Fayette, New York. Here, Whitmer was a member of the German Reformed Church.

Foundation of the Latter Day Saint movement
Whitmer's brother David and his entire family became early followers of Joseph Smith, the founder of the Latter Day Saint movement. Joseph and his wife, Emma Smith, boarded with the Whitmers for six months. Whitmer was baptized into the movement by Oliver Cowdery in June 1829, nearly a year prior to the formal organization of the Church of Christ. In that same month, Whitmer became one of eight men who signed a testimony that they had handled and been shown the golden plates. Known as the "Testimony of the Eight Witnesses", the statement was printed in the first edition of the Book of Mormon and has been included in almost every subsequent edition.

The church was formally organized on April 6, 1830 in the Whitmer family's home. John Whitmer was one of the earliest members and he was ordained an elder of the church on June 9. He moved to the church's new headquarters at Kirtland, Ohio in December 1830 at the encouragement of Joseph Smith. The next year, on March 8, 1831, Smith said that he received a revelation from God, calling Whitmer to "write and keep a regular history" of the church. This revelation was printed by Latter Day Saints as Book of Commandments 50, and in the Doctrine and Covenants (originally section 63, the revelation is now section 47 of the LDS Church edition). He soon began writing a historical record of the church, a project he worked on until about 1847. Whitmer was to "accompany Oliver Cowdery to Zion (Independence, Missouri) with the manuscript of the Book of Commandments, forerunner of the Doctrine and Covenants, and [was] made one of the stewards over the modern revelations."

Whitmer was made a high priest in the church by Lyman Wight on June 4, 1831 and acted as one of Joseph Smith's scribes during the final steps of the Book of Mormon translation.

Leader of the church in Missouri

Later in 1831, Whitmer joined the growing number of Latter Day Saints in Jackson County, Missouri.  Here, he married Sarah Maria Jackson on February 10, 1833. Local opposition to Mormon settlement in the county resulted in the expulsion of most of the Latter Day Saints by November 1833. Whitmer, along with many of the others, took refuge in neighboring Clay County. At a July 3, 1834 conference of the church, Whitmer's brother David was called to be the president of the church in Missouri. John Whitmer was called as his brother's second counselor, and W. W. Phelps was called as his first. When David returned to Kirtland, John Whitmer and Phelps were left to preside in his absence. Whitmer wrote several petitions to Missouri's governor, Daniel Dunklin, asking that the Latter Day Saints be allowed to return to their lands in Jackson County. He also edited the Latter Day Saints' Messenger and Advocate from 1835 to 1836 in his capacity as a member of the church presidency.

Whitmer and Phelps worked with sympathetic non-Mormon residents in Clay County, such as Alexander Doniphan, to purchase land northeast of Clay. The land became Caldwell County, a new county set aside for Mormon settlement. Together with Phelps, Whitmer founded the town of Far West. He remained a member of the church presidency until his excommunication in 1838.

Whitmer's excommunication
Problems at church headquarters in Kirtland relating to the Kirtland Safety Society bank caused Joseph Smith and Sidney Rigdon to relocate to Far West in early 1838. A brief leadership struggle ensued, which led to the excommunication of the entire Whitmer family, as well as Oliver Cowdery, W. W. Phelps, and others on March 10, 1838. Upon his excommunication, John Whitmer refused to give the church the documents and records he had worked on as Church Historian. Whitmer was accused of "persisting in unchristianlike conduct," particularly in his financial dealings; he allegedly allotted $2,000 worth of the church's money for his own personal use.  He had, along with David Whitmer and W. W. Phelps, purchased deeds to land in Far West under his own name instead of the church's. Whitmer continued to live in Far West for a time and became known as one of the "dissenters". Sidney Rigdon, in his "Salt Sermon", warned the dissenters to leave the county, and his words were soon followed up by perceived threats from the newly formed Mormon confraternity known as the Danites.

Whitmer moved to Richmond in neighboring Ray County, Missouri. The Whitmer family's complaints and those of the other dissenters are sometimes cited as one of the causes of the 1838 Mormon War. This conflict between Latter Day Saints and their neighbors in northwestern Missouri ended with the expulsion of the former, who eventually relocated to a new headquarters at Nauvoo, Illinois.

Whitmer returns to Far West
Whitmer's parents and his brother David remained in Richmond for the rest of their lives, but John and his own family returned to Far West. He bought 625 acres of land in the town. Emptied of Latter Day Saints, Far West became a ghost town. Many of its houses were moved off to other settlements, and Far West lost the county seat to nearby Kingston. Whitmer continued to live in Far West, buying up land (including the proposed temple site) and eventually amassing a large farm. He occasionally gave visitors tours of the former settlement.

After Joseph Smith's death in 1844, several leaders asserted their claims to be his rightful successor. Among these was Whitmer's brother David. In 1847, Whitmer was briefly part of a renewed Church of Christ (Whitmerite). He never recanted the testimony of the Book of Mormon he'd given as one of the Eight Witnesses. When Jacob Gates visited him in 1861, Whitmer reaffirmed that he believed in the Book of Mormon but expressed dismay with the practice of plural marriage that Brigham Young and his followers adhered to.

Whitmer died at the age of 75 on July 11, 1878 in Far West. He is buried in nearby Kingston, Missouri in the Kingston Cemetery.

Whitmer's manuscript
Whitmer was called as Church Historian, and began to write a record entitled The Book of John Whitmer, Kept by Commandment. His book begins with an account of events leading up to the relocation of the church's headquarters from New York to Kirtland, Ohio. He discusses many of the troubles experienced by the Latter Day Saints in Missouri and ends the work with an account of his own excommunication in March 1838. Afterwards, a continuation tells of the mistreatment he felt he and the other dissenters had received at the hands of Joseph Smith and Sidney Rigdon. Whitmer's manuscript is now in the archives of the Community of Christ.

John Whitmer Historical Association 

On September 18, 1972, historians and scholars associated with the Reorganized Church of Jesus Christ of Latter Day Saints (RLDS Church) founded the John Whitmer Historical Association (JWHA) as "an independent scholarly society composed of individuals of various religious faiths who share a lively interest in ... Latter Day Saint history, especially the history of the Community of Christ." The association publishes two academic journals, the John Whitmer Historical Association Journal and Restoration Studies, as well as a newsletter. It also holds conferences and lecture series and gives awards.

References 

Bruce N. Westergren, From Historian to Dissident:  The Book of John Whitmer, Salt Lake City, 1995.
Keith W. Perkins, "True to the Book of Mormon—The Whitmers", Ensign, February 1989.

External links 
 
 
Whitmer family papers and photographs, MSS 3198 at L. Tom Perry Special Collections, Harold B. Lee Library, Brigham Young University
John Whitmer letter, MSS 1215 at L. Tom Perry Special Collections, Harold B. Lee Library, Brigham Young University
Collection on early Mormon history, MSS SC 954 at L. Tom Perry Special Collections, Harold B. Lee Library, Brigham Young University
John Whitmer land patents, MSS SC 245 at L. Tom Perry Special Collections, Harold B. Lee Library, Brigham Young University
Joseph Smith patriarchal blessing for John Whitmer, MSS 239 at L. Tom Perry Special Collections, Harold B. Lee Library, Brigham Young University

1802 births
1878 deaths
American Latter Day Saints
Book of Mormon witnesses
Converts to Mormonism
Doctrine and Covenants people
Editors of Latter Day Saint publications
Leaders in the Church of Christ (Latter Day Saints)
Official historians of the Church of Jesus Christ of Latter-day Saints
People excommunicated by the Church of Christ (Latter Day Saints)
People from Far West, Missouri
People from Fayette, New York
Religious leaders from New York (state)
Whitmer family
Harold B. Lee Library-related 19th century articles